Grabinski or Grabiński may refer to:

 Christoph Grabinski (born 1990), German footballer
 Cristian Grabinski (born 1980), Argentine footballer
 Michael Grabinski (born 1960), Professor at Neu-Ulm University
 Hartmut Grabinski (born 1952), Professor at Leibniz University
 Stanisław Bohdan Grabiński (1891–1930), Polish nobleman
 Stefan Grabiński (1887–1936), Polish writer